Shojo may refer to: 
  ( or ), a sea spirit with red hair and a fondness for alcohol in Japanese mythology
  ( or ), a less common Japanese word for orangutan
 , the Japanese word for "female virgin"
 , the Japanese word for letter (message)
  manga, Japanese comics with a target demographic of young or teenage girls

People with the surname
, Japanese mixed martial artist

See also
 Shōjo Comic, a  manga magazine published by Shogakukan since 1968
 , a Buddhist temple in Yugawa, Japan
  (disambiguation), the Japanese word for "young boy" or "minor"

Japanese-language surnames